The Portrait of Frederick III of Saxony is a tempera on canvas painting by German Renaissance artist Albrecht Dürer, executed in 1496. It is housed in the Gemäldegalerie of Berlin, Germany.

History
The painting was one of the first commissions received from Frederick III, Elector of Saxony, together with the Seven Sorrows Polyptych and the central panel of the  Dresden Altarpiece. Dürer knew the elector during the latter's short stay in Nuremberg in April 1496.
 
The German artist portrayed the Elector again in a burin etching in 1524.

Description
Dürer portrayed Frederick's bust from three-quarters, looking right, above a dark green background. Elements such as the parapet on which his arms lie, or the hands holding a roll, were typical of Flemish art of the period.

Frederick's impervious personality, as well as his status, are  emphasized by the large beret and by his determined glance

References

Frederick III
1496 paintings
Paintings in the Gemäldegalerie, Berlin